John William Moor (born 1881) was a British socialist activist.

Moor received an elementary education, then later attended the Diocesan Training College in Chester, graduating in 1903.  He became a schoolteacher in Rochdale, where he joined the Conservative Party.  However, he developed an interest in socialism, and defected to the Independent Labour Party (ILP) in 1907, immediately becoming honorary secretary of the local party.  The ILP was affiliated to the Labour Party, and Moor was also secretary of the Rochdale Labour Party from 1908.

Moor also joined the National Union of Teachers and in 1912 he became president of the Rochdale Teachers' Association.  He served as an emergency Parliamentary agent for the Labour Party in the run-up to the 1918 UK general election, but then returned to teaching.  After World War I, he was elected as secretary of the Lancshire Divisional Council of the ILP, and also of its Rochdale Federation.  From 1928 until 1931, he served as a nationally-elected member of the ILP's National Administrative Council.

References

1881 births
Year of death missing
English trade unionists
Independent Labour Party National Administrative Committee members
People from Rochdale